Sixten Larsson (31 July 1918 – 3 February 1995) was a Swedish athlete who competed mainly in the 400 m hurdles. In this event he won a silver medal at the 1946 European Athletics Championships as well as five national titles in 1940–1944.

References

1918 births
1995 deaths
Swedish male hurdlers
European Athletics Championships medalists